The ministry for Higher Education, Science and Technology is a department in the Zimbabwean government who is responsible for the management of higher education and scientific and technological development within the country. The position was created by President Emmerson Mnangagwa following his cabinet formation in December 2017, when he split Primary and Secondary Education and Sport, Arts and Recreation into two separate government agencies. The incumbent minister is Amon Murwira, who was appointed on 31 November 2017.

See also 
 Ministry of Higher and Tertiary Education (Zimbabwe)

References

Government of Zimbabwe
Zimbabwe